The 2011 UFL Draft was the third and final draft of the United Football League. The draft took place on Monday, May 2, 2011. The draft was held over a period of 10 rounds during which each of the five UFL teams was allowed one pick per round, in reverse order of 2010 finish, with the last-place Hartford Colonials picking first and the champion Las Vegas Locomotives picking last in each round. The expansion Virginia Destroyers took the place of the defunct Florida Tuskers, from whom the Destroyers inherited their staff, in the draft order; the Destroyers also received a "bonus selection" at both the end of the fourth round and the end of the draft, respectively. During rounds one and two, each team had five minutes to make their selection of a player. During rounds three through ten, each team had three minutes to make their selection of a player. The round by round results were announced via the Twitter feeds of each individual coach, as well as through commissioner Michael Huyghue's Twitter feed.

The UFL moved its draft up to May 2, two days after the end of the 2011 NFL Draft, in part to accommodate the UFL's proposed earlier start in August (since abandoned) for the 2011 season, and also to take advantage of the lockout in the National Football League. Players who went undrafted in the 2011 NFL Draft could not sign with NFL teams because of the lockout. As a result, the UFL made efforts to draft and sign those players before the lockout was lifted. Pat Devlin, the former Delaware quarterback and one of the higher rated undrafted prospects, was given an offer to be the first overall draft pick, but because the Hartford Colonials also requested he sign a UFL contract as a condition of being picked, Devlin declined. As in previous UFL drafts, players with professional experience were also eligible to be drafted. Overall, 24 undrafted rookies and 28 professional veterans were selected in the draft.

First overall draft pick Jerrod Johnson defected from the UFL to the Philadelphia Eagles in late July 2011, amid rumors that the Colonials were to be contracted. He returned to the UFL for the 2012 season, this time with the Sacramento Mountain Lions.

Players selected in the draft remain on each team's Reserve/Unsigned list until the player signs the league's standard form contract and is added to the roster.

Trades
The Las Vegas Locomotives traded their fourth-round draft pick to the Hartford Colonials and their tenth-round pick to the Omaha Nighthawks.
The Sacramento Mountain Lions traded their eighth-round draft pick to the Omaha Nighthawks.

Draft Results

Round one

Round two

Round three

Round four

Round five

Round six

Round seven

Round eight

Round nine

Round ten

Notes
(* indicates signed for 2011 season)
(** indicates signed, but defected to the NFL)

References

External links
2011 UFL Draft – Official UFL information page

United Football League (2009–2012) Draft
Draft
UFL Draft